Cragia adiastola is a moth of the subfamily Arctiinae. It was described by Sergius G. Kiriakoff in 1958. It is found in Burundi, the Democratic Republic of the Congo, Kenya and Uganda.

References

Lithosiini
Moths described in 1958
Moths of Africa